GRIP1-associated protein 1 is a protein that in humans is encoded by the GRIPAP1 gene.

Function 

GRASP1 is a neuron-specific guanine nucleotide exchange factor for the Ras family of small G proteins (RasGEF) and is associated with the GRIP/AMPA receptor complex in brain (Ye et al., 2000).[supplied by OMIM]

Interactions 

GRIPAP1 has been shown to interact with GRIP1.

References

Further reading